Sverrir Ingi Ingason (born 5 August 1993) is an Icelandic professional footballer who plays as a defender for Greek Super League club PAOK and the Iceland national team.

Sverrir previously played for Icelandic club Breiðablik UBK before transferring to Viking FK. After a successful spell at the Norwegian club he moved to Lokeren of Belgium.

An Icelandic youth international, he participated at the UEFA Euro 2016 and the 2018 World Cup with the senior team.

Early life 
Sverrir was born in Kópavogur, a city near by the capital of Iceland, Reykjavík. He started playing football at the age of 4 at his local club Breiðablik. The club is known for its great youth system which has produced players like Gylfi Sigurðsson, Alfreð Finnbogason and Jóhann Berg Guðmundsson.

Club career

Breiðablik 
In 2011 at the age of 18 Sverrir started playing for Breiðablik's feeder club Augnablik. He quickly got the attention of the parent's club manager, Ólafur Kristjánsson, who made Sverrir one of his key players. After that season 2012–13 he was voted the most promising player in Breiðablik.

In the season 2013–14 he became one of the best players in the league. He was voted the best player of Breiðablik and made it into the divisions team of the year.

Viking 
Sverrir was the subject of transfer speculation, with the player linked to several clubs. On 1 January 2014 he decided to sign for Norwegian club Viking FK. At the club he played along with four other Icelandic players, Indriði Sigurðsson, Jón Daði Böðvarsson, Steinþór Freyr Þorsteinsson and Björn Daníel Sverrisson.

Sverrir was influential early on and right away started all the games in the heart of defence alongside the club's captain and one of Iceland's most experienced centre backs, Indriði Sigurdsson.  After his first season, he was voted Viking FK best player of 2014.

Lokeren 
One year later, in February 2015 Sverrir opted for a move to Lokeren. His debut with the new club was made one week later against Oostende for the league playing for 90 minutes. Making great appearances and playing all the matches for his club, Lokeren finished 8th for the Regular season and 1st for the Europa League playoffs. The next season Ingi made 32 appearances and scoring his only goal with the club against Standard Liège on 13 September. With his market value going up after another 21 appearances on 2016–17 season with the Tricolores, in January 2017 Granada CF made a move to take his signature for €1.8 million.

He stayed in Belgium making 70 appearances and scoring one goal.

Granada 

Sverrir moved to Andalusia for the first semester of 2017, joining Granada. He maintained his high level of performances, but his team could not avoid relegation. In the summer of 2017, FC Rostov paid €1.2 million to secure his services.

Rostov 
On 30 June 2017, Russian Premier League side Rostov announced the signing of Sverrir on a three-year contract.
Ingi united in Rostov with his national teammates Ragnar Sigurðsson and Björn Bergmann Sigurðarson finding there a good atmosphere to settle up on a new country. Full season for Ingarson making 30 appearances and scoring three goals overall for the Selmashi and finished 11th in the League also got to the Round of 16 Russian Cup.

In the 2018–19 season, making a good start, Ingason played 17 matches and scored twice.

On the winter transfer window on the same season PAOK made the move to buy him for a €4.5 million transfer fee.

PAOK 
On 1 February 2019, Sverrir joined Greek club PAOK on a three-and-a-half-year contract. During the 2018–19 season Ingasson won the double with PAOK. On 1 December 2019, he scored his first goal with the club in an away derby match against rivals Olympiakos in a final 1–1 draw. On 23 December 2019, he scored a brace in a hammering 5–1 home win against Atromitos and the club will celebrate Christmas 2019 at the top of the Super League I table.

The following year 2019–20 he had an upgraded role in the team, playing in a total of 34 games, while offering four goals and one assist. In 2020–221, he was, for another year, a key member of the team for most of the season. In the final of the year, he suffered an injury that left him out for a long time. Nevertheless, he was crowned Greek cup winner for the second time with the PAOK jersey. In the final on 22 May, PAOK faced OSFP, with Dikefalos of the North prevailing with a score of 2–1. He did not play due to his injury.

On 1 February 2021, PAOK rejected a €5 million offer from an unnamed English club for his services.

Coming back from a long period of recovery from an injury, Sverrir temporarily played for PAOK B in Super League Greece 2, and made his debut on the first match of the season, on 6 November 2021.

The "black and white" announced the extension of its cooperation with Ingi Ingasson until the summer of 2025. "Let's go PAOKara", the first message of the Icelandic stopper.
The agreement that existed a week ago between PAOK and Ingi Ingasson became official, with the "black and white" formalizing the event on Wednesday afternoon (23/2/22).

International career 

Sverrir was an Icelandic youth international, having earned caps at under-18, under-20 and at the under-21 level. He captained his side at the UEFA Euro Under-21s in 2015 where they lost against Denmark in the play-offs on away goals. He made his debut for the senior national team in January 2014 against Sweden. He was part of the squad which made it to the quarter-finals of the UEFA Euro 2016.

In May 2018, he was named in Iceland's 23-man squad for the 2018 World Cup in Russia.

Career statistics

Club

International 

Scores and results list Iceland's goal tally first, score column indicates score after each Sverrir goal.

Honours 
Breiðablik
Icelandic League Cup: 2013

PAOK
Super League Greece: 2018–19
Greek Cup: 2018–19, 2020–21; Runner-Up :2021–22

International
Baltic Cup: 2022

Individual
Super League Greece Team of the Year : 2020–21

References

External links 

Total Football

Living people
1993 births
Sverrir Ingi Ingason
Sverrir Ingi Ingason
Sverrir Ingi Ingason
Sverrir Ingi Ingason
Association football midfielders
Sverrir Ingi Ingason
Viking FK players
Eliteserien players
K.S.C. Lokeren Oost-Vlaanderen players
Granada CF footballers
FC Rostov players
Sverrir Ingi Ingason
Sverrir Ingi Ingason
Sverrir Ingi Ingason
PAOK FC players
PAOK FC B players
Belgian Pro League players
La Liga players
Russian Premier League players
Super League Greece players
Super League Greece 2 players
Sverrir Ingi Ingason
Sverrir Ingi Ingason
Sverrir Ingi Ingason
Sverrir Ingi Ingason
Sverrir Ingi Ingason
Sverrir Ingi Ingason
Expatriate footballers in Norway
Expatriate footballers in Belgium
Expatriate footballers in Russia
Expatriate footballers in Spain
Expatriate footballers in Greece
UEFA Euro 2016 players
2018 FIFA World Cup players